The Lower Rhine Cup (German: Niederrheinpokal) is a German football club Cup competition open to teams from the Lower Rhine region of the state of North Rhine-Westphalia. The competition is one of the 21 regional cup competitions of German football and acts as a qualifier for the following seasons' German Cup.

The competition is sponsored by the Diebels brewery and carries the official name Diebels Niederrheinpokal. It is operated by the Lower Rhine Football Association, the FVN.

Modus
Clubs from fully professional leagues are not permitted to enter the competition, meaning, no teams from the Fußball-Bundesliga and the 2nd Bundesliga can compete.

All clubs from the Lower Rhine playing in the 3. Liga (III), Regionalliga West (IV) and Oberliga Niederrhein (V) are directly qualified for the first round, the remaining places in the first round are filled with the teams who qualified from local cup competitions, the Kreispokale.

Since the establishment of the 3. Liga in 2008, reserve teams can not take part in the German Cup or the Lower Rhine Cup anymore.

Winners
The past winners of the competition:

No cup held or winner known for 1984, 1988, 1992 and 1993. In 1992 Wuppertaler SV und Fortuna Düsseldorf Amateure both qualified for the first round of the German Cup through the Lower Rhine Cup.

References

Deutschlands Fußball in Zahlen,  An annual publication with tables and results from the Bundesliga to Verbandsliga/Landesliga, publisher: DSFS

External links
Fussball.de: Lower Rhine Cup 
Diebels Niederrheinpokal  FVN website

Football cup competitions in Germany
Football competitions in North Rhine-Westphalia
1980 establishments in West Germany
Recurring sporting events established in 1980